This article details the qualifying phase for table tennis at the 2020 Summer Olympics . The competition at these Games will comprise a total of 172 table tennis players coming from their respective NOCs; each may enter up to six athletes, two male and two female athletes in singles events, up to one men's and one women's team in team events, and up to one pair in mixed doubles.

As the host nation, Japan automatically qualified six athletes, a team of three men and women with one each competing in the singles as well as a mixed doubles team.

For the team events, 16 teams qualify. Each continent (with the Americas being divided into North America and South America for ITTF competition) had a qualifying competition to qualify one team. Nine teams qualify through a world qualifying event. Japan, as the host, is guaranteed a team spot.

The mixed doubles will also have 16 pairs qualify. Each continent (with the Americas being divided into North America and South America for ITTF competition) had a qualifying competition to qualify one pair. Four teams qualify through the World Tour Grand Finals 2019 and five through the World Tour 2020. Japan is also guaranteed a place. If an NOC has both a mixed doubles pair and a team in one or both genders qualify, the doubles player must be a member of the team in their gender.

For individual events, between 64 and 70 individual players qualify. Each NOC with a qualified team may enter 2 members of that team in the individual competition. 22 quota places will be awarded through continental championships to individuals who belong to an NOC without a qualified team. There will be one Tripartite Commission invitation place. The remainder of the total 172 quota places will be filled through a final world singles qualifying tournament (no less than two and no more than eight qualifiers) and then the ITTF world ranking.

Qualification summary

Events

Men's team

Women's team

Mixed doubles

Men's singles

Women's singles

See also
Table tennis at the 2020 Summer Paralympics – Qualification

References

Qualification for the 2020 Summer Olympics
Table tennis at the 2020 Summer Olympics